The Jasmund National Park (German: Nationalpark Jasmund) is a nature reserve on the Jasmund peninsula, in the northeast of Rügen island in Mecklenburg-Vorpommern, Germany. It is famous for containing the largest chalk cliffs in Germany, the Königsstuhl (German = "king's chair"). The beech forests behind the cliffs are also part of the national park.

Consisting of only , this is the smallest national park in Germany. The park was founded in 1990 by the last government of East Germany (GDR) prior to the German reunification.

On June 25, 2011, the beech forest in the park was added to the UNESCO World Heritage List as an extension of the Primeval Beech Forests of Europe site because of its undisturbed nature and its testimony to the ecological history of Europe since the last Ice Age.

Chalk cliffs
The cliffs of Jasmund National Park belong to the Rügen Chalk unit. The chalk cliffs face constant erosion. With every storm, parts of the cliffs fall, including rocks and fossils of sponges, oysters and sea urchins.

One of the most scenic and best known of the chalk outcrops, the Wissower Klinken, collapsed into the Baltic Sea on February 24, 2005, in a landslide caused by spring-thaw weather conditions.

Flora and fauna
Because of the special geological characteristics of the Jasmund National Park, it is home to many rare plants and animals.

In the woods of the Stubnitz, behind the cliffs, there are numerous water-filled dells and hollows, most of which came into existence as ice-age dead-ice holes. A wide range of plants are found in this area, for example, black alder, European crab apple, wild service tree, yew and orchids (like the Cypripedium calceolus).

A variety of birds live in the park: white-tailed eagle, kingfisher, house martin and the peregrine falcon.

Visitor management 

Since its creation in 1934, the Jasmund National Park has attracted hundreds of thousands of visitors annually. One of the main tasks of the National Park Authority is to ensure that the diverse habitats of the park remain largely undisturbed, whilst still allowing visitors an insight into the nature of the region. In March 2004, the visitor centre, the Königsstuhl National Park Centre, was opened.

Gallery

References

External links 

 
 Jasmund National Park pictures and information about the chalk cliffs 
 Official site 
 Photos of the park's beech forests 

National parks of Germany
Cliffs of Germany
Forests and woodlands of Germany
Protected areas of Mecklenburg-Western Pomerania
Protected areas established in 1990
Geography of Rügen
1990 establishments in East Germany
Landforms of Mecklenburg-Western Pomerania
Primeval Beech Forests in Europe